Roman Africa may refer to the following areas of Northern Africa which were part of the Imperium Romanum and/or the Western/Byzantine successor empires :

 in the unified Roman empire 
 Africa (Roman province), with the great metropolis Carthage
 later restricted to Africa Proconsularis (which would be split into Tripolitania, Africa Byzacena and Africa Zeugitana) after the detachment of Numidia
 the whole of Roman North Africa, stretching from Egypt, with the greatest metropolis Alexandria, and Cyrenaica to the east of above Africa proper to the westernmost provinces in Mauretania

 later 
 Diocese of Africa, from Diocletian's tetrarchy reform till the Vandal conquest, under the (Western) Praetorian prefecture of Italy
 the early-Byzantine Praetorian prefecture of Africa
 the later Byzantine Exarchate of Africa

See also
 Africa (disambiguation)
 Roman Europe (disambiguation)
 Roman Orient (disambiguation)